Nichola Anne "Nicky" Grant (born 13 August 1976) is a Scottish international footballer, who plays as a midfielder. She currently plays in the Scottish Women's Premier League for Forfar Farmington, having previously played in England for Arsenal and Doncaster Rovers Belles as well as in Iceland, Germany and Sweden. Grant amassed over 90 appearances for the Scotland women's national football team.

Club career
Born in Aberdeen and brought up in Elgin, Grant first came to prominence as a member of a successful Cove Rangers team. She scored twice in the 1996 Scottish Women's Cup final as Cove beat Aberdeen 5–1 at McDiarmid Park. After switching to Cumbernauld United, Grant won a domestic treble in 1997–98.

In the 2000 Scottish Women's Cup final, Grant scored four goals in Stenhousemuir's 9–0 win over Clyde.

Grant spent the 2001 summer season in Iceland with ÍBV and scored three goals in ten Úrvalsdeild appearances. She then collected an FA Women's Premier League winners medal with Arsenal Ladies in 2002, but did not wish to move to London long term. In 2003 Grant joined Frauen Bundesliga champions 1. FFC Frankfurt as a full–time professional. She did not remain long in Germany due to injuries and returned to Scotland to work as a teacher while playing for Kilmarnock.

In January 2005, Grant rejected an approach from Sunderland in favour of Doncaster Rovers Belles. Grant helped Doncaster avoid relegation by scoring the second goal in a vital 2–0 win over Bristol City, but she was sent off for removing her shirt in celebration.

In summer 2007 she joined Swedish Damallsvenskan club QBIK at the invitation of international teammate Ifeoma Dieke.

After a spell at Hamilton Academical, Grant signed for Celtic in 2011. She returned to Accies during the Scottish Women's Premier League mid–season break. Grant signed for Forfar Farmington ahead of the 2012 season, after moving to the Angus area for work reasons.

International career
Grant made her senior debut for Scotland against Italy in October 1993. The Scots were beaten 4–0 in the 1995 UEFA Women's Championship qualification match hosted in Senigallia.

In summer 2003 Grant had a disagreement with the Scotland management team and spent a year out of the national team. She was recalled in July 2004 after her Kilmarnock Ladies manager Jim Chapman interceded.

Personal life
Grant's brother Graeme is also a footballer, who played with Buckie Thistle and Forres Mechanics in the Highland Football League, as well as spending 2002–03 with Elgin City in the Scottish Football League Third Division.

As of 2019, she was the head teacher of Alness Academy having been appointed at the end of the previous year. She had previously held senior roles at schools in Aberdeenshire and Moray.

Grant became the Director of Education for Highland in 2019, after just 9 months at Alness Academy.

References

External links
Nicky Grant Celtic FC profile

1976 births
Living people
Scottish women's footballers
Scotland women's international footballers
Footballers from Aberdeen
Hibernian W.F.C. players
Celtic F.C. Women players
Arsenal W.F.C. players
Doncaster Rovers Belles L.F.C. players
1. FFC Frankfurt players
Glasgow City F.C. players
F.C. Kilmarnock Ladies players
Expatriate women's footballers in Germany
Expatriate women's footballers in Iceland
Expatriate women's footballers in Sweden
Scottish expatriate women's footballers
Scottish expatriate sportspeople in Germany
Scottish expatriate sportspeople in Sweden
Scottish expatriate sportspeople in Iceland
QBIK players
Damallsvenskan players
FA Women's National League players
Women's association football midfielders
Forfar Farmington F.C. players
Hamilton Academical W.F.C. players
Scottish schoolteachers